The 2015–16 Dynamo Moscow season was the 93rd season in the club's history. They participated in the Russian Premier League and the Russian Cup, having been disqualified from Europa League for violating Financial Fair Play by not breaking even the previous season.

Squad

Out on loan

Reserve squad

Transfers

Summer

In:

Out:

Winter

In:

Out:

Competitions

Russian Premier League

Results by round

Matches

League table

Russian Cup

Squad statistics

Appearances and goals

|-
|colspan="14"|Players away from the club on loan:

|-
|colspan="14"|Players who appeared for Dynamo Moscow but left during the season:

|}

Goal scorers

Disciplinary record

References

FC Dynamo Moscow seasons
Dynamo Moscow